A ctenidium is a respiratory organ or gill which is found in many molluscs. This structure exists in bivalves, cephalopods, Polyplacophorans (chitons), and in aquatic gastropods such as freshwater snails and marine snails. Some aquatic gastropods possess one ctenidium known as monopectinate and others have a pair of ctenidia known as bipectinate.

A ctenidium is shaped like a comb or a feather, with a central part from which many filaments or plate-like structures protrude, lined up in a row. It hangs into the mantle cavity and increases the area available for gas exchange. The word is Latinized but is derived from the Greek ktenidion which means "little comb", being a diminutive of the word kteis meaning comb.

References

Bivalve anatomy
Cephalopod zootomy
Gastropod anatomy
Invertebrate respiratory system